Paolo Borgia (born 18 March 1966) is an Italian prelate of the Catholic Church who has worked in the diplomatic service of the Holy See since 2001.

Biography
Borgia was born in Manfredonia (Foggia) and was ordained a priest on 10 April 1999. He studied canon law and prepared for a diplomatic career at the Pontifical Ecclesiastical Academy. He entered the diplomatic service of the Holy See on 1 December 2001 and was posted to the Nunciature to the Central African Republic with the rank of Attaché. He was promoted to secretary (second class) on 1 December 2002. In 2004 he was transferred to Mexico, where he served until 2004.

He was again promoted in 2006, becoming first secretary. He was posted to Israel in 2007 and was promoted to counsellor three years later. After his posting in Israel he served in Lebanon from 2010, where he worked with Archbishop Gabriele Giordano Caccia. He returned to Rome to work in the Second Section in 2013 and was transferred to the Section for General Affairs on 29 October 2014. He was promoted to counsellor, first class, on 1 December 2014.

Pope Francis appointed him to serve as Assessor for General Affairs on 4 March 2016.

On 3 September 2019, Pope Francis named him titular archbishop of Milazzo and gave him the title of apostolic nuncio. He received his episcopal consecration from Francis on 4 October.

On 28 October 2019, Pope Francis named him Apostolic Nuncio to the Côte d'Ivoire.

On 24 September 2022, Pope Francis named him Apostolic Nuncio to the Lebanon.

See also
 List of heads of the diplomatic missions of the Holy See

References

Living people
1966 births
Apostolic Nuncios to Lebanon
21st-century Italian Roman Catholic priests
Pontifical Ecclesiastical Academy alumni
People from Manfredonia
Apostolic Nuncios to Ivory Coast